"A Ton of Love" is the first single from British post-punk revival band Editors from their 2013 album, The Weight of Your Love.

The song first aired on 6 May 2013 on Zane Lowe's BBC Radio 1 show, with the music video being released on the same day. It was made available as a download from midnight on 6 May 2013, included in the pre-order of the album The Weight of Your Love on the iTunes Store. The single was released as a digital download on 14 June 2013, and is set to be released on 7” vinyl on 24 June 2013.

Track listings

Chart performance

References

Editors (band) songs
2013 singles
2013 songs
PIAS Recordings singles
Song recordings produced by Jacquire King
Songs written by Edward Lay
Songs written by Russell Leetch
Songs written by Tom Smith (musician)
Songs written by Justin Lockey
Songs written by Elliott Williams